The 20th César Awards ceremony, presented by the Académie des Arts et Techniques du Cinéma, honoured the best French films of 1994 and took place on 25 February 1995 at the Palais des Congrès in Paris. The ceremony was chaired by Alain Delon and hosted by Jean-Claude Brialy and Pierre Tchernia. Wild Reeds won the award for Best Film.

Winners and nominees
The winners are highlighted in bold:

Best Film:Wild Reeds, directed by André TéchinéLe Fils préféré, directed by Nicole GarciaLéon, directed by Luc BessonLa Reine Margot, directed by Patrice ChéreauTrois Couleurs: Rouge, directed by Krzysztof Kieślowski 
Best Foreign Film:Four Weddings and a Funeral, directed by Mike NewellCaro diario, directed by Nanni MorettiPulp Fiction, directed by Quentin TarantinoSchindler's List, directed by Steven SpielbergShort Cuts, directed by Robert Altman
Best Debut:Regarde les hommes tomber, directed by Jacques AudiardLe Colonel Chabert, directed by Yves AngeloMina Tannenbaum, directed by Martine DugowsonPersonne ne m'aime, directed by Marion VernouxPetits arrangements avec les morts, directed by Pascale Ferran
Best Actor:Gérard Lanvin, for Le Fils préféréGérard Depardieu, for Le Colonel ChabertJean Reno, for LéonDaniel Auteuil, for La SéparationJean-Louis Trintignant, for Trois Couleurs: Rouge
Best Actress:Isabelle Adjani, for La Reine MargotSandrine Bonnaire, for Jeanne la Pucelle II - Les prisonsAnémone, for Pas très catholiqueIsabelle Huppert, for La SéparationIrène Jacob, for Trois Couleurs: Rouge
Best Supporting Actor:Jean-Hugues Anglade, for La Reine MargotFabrice Luchini, for Le Colonel ChabertClaude Rich, for La Fille de d'ArtagnanBernard Giraudeau, for Le Fils préféréDaniel Russo, for Neuf mois
Best Supporting Actress:Virna Lisi, for La Reine MargotLine Renaud, for J'ai pas sommeilCatherine Jacob, for Neuf moisDominique Blanc, for La Reine MargotMichèle Moretti, for Les Roseaux sauvages
Most Promising Actor:Mathieu Kassovitz, for Regarde les hommes tomberCharles Berling, for Petits arrangements avec les mortsFrédéric Gorny, for Les Roseaux sauvagesGaël Morel, for Les Roseaux sauvagesStéphane Rideau, for Les Roseaux sauvages
Most Promising Actress:Élodie Bouchez, for Les Roseaux sauvagesMarie Bunel, for Couples et amantsVirginie Ledoyen, for L'Eau froideElsa Zylberstein, for Mina TannenbaumSandrine Kiberlain, for Les Patriotes
Best Director:André Téchiné, for Les Roseaux sauvagesNicole Garcia, for Le Fils préféréLuc Besson, for LéonPatrice Chéreau, for La Reine MargotKrzysztof Kieślowski, for Trois Couleurs: Rouge
Best Writing:André Téchiné, Gilles Taurand, Olivier Massart, for Les Roseaux sauvagesMichel Blanc, for Grosse fatigueJacques Audiard, Alain Le Henry, for Regarde les hommes tomberPatrice Chéreau, Danièle Thompson, for La Reine MargotKrzysztof Kieślowski, Krzysztof Piesiewicz, for Trois Couleurs: Rouge
Best Cinematography:Philippe Rousselot, for La Reine MargotBernard Lutic, for Le Colonel ChabertThierry Arbogast, for Léon
Best Costume Design:Moidele Bickel, for La Reine MargotFranca Squarciapino, for Le Colonel ChabertAnne de Laugardière, Olga Berluti, for Farinelli
Best Sound:Jean-Paul Mugel, Dominique Hennequin, for FarinelliFrançois Groult, Pierre Excoffier, Gérard Lamps, Bruno Tarrière, for LéonWilliam Flageollet, Jean-Claude Laureux, for Trois Couleurs: Rouge
Best Editing:Juliette Welfling, for Regarde les hommes tomberSylvie Landra, for LéonFrançois Gédigier, Hélène Viard, for La Reine Margot
Best Music:Zbigniew Preisner, for Trois Couleurs: RougePhilippe Sarde, for La Fille de d'ArtagnanÉric Serra, for LéonGoran Bregović, for La Reine Margot
Best Production Design:Gianni Quaranta, for FarinelliBernard Vézat, for Le Colonel ChabertRichard Peduzzi, Olivier Radot, for La Reine Margot
Best Animated Short:Elles, directed by Joanna QuinnEx-memoriam, directed by Beriou
Best Fiction Short:La Vis, directed by Didier FlamandDeus ex Machnia, directed by Vincent MayrandEmilie Muller, directed by Yvon Marciano
Best Documentary Film:Caught in the Acts (Délits flagrants), directed by Raymond DepardonBosna!, directed by Bernard-Henri LévyMontand, directed by Jean LabibTsahal, directed by Claude LanzmannThe Righteous (Tzedek - les justes), directed by Marek HafterVeillées d'armes, directed by Marcel OphülsLa Véritable histoire d'Artaud le momo, directed by Gérard Mordillat, Jérôme Prieur
Honorary César:Jeanne MoreauGregory PeckSteven Spielberg
César des Césars: Cyrano de Bergerac, directed by Jean-Paul Rappeneau

See also
 67th Academy Awards
 48th British Academy Film Awards

External links
 Official website
 
 20th César Awards at AlloCiné

1995
1995 film awards
Ces